"Die Young" is a song by American rapper Sleepy Hallow, released on May 25, 2022 by Winners Circle Entertainment and RCA Records. It features Canadian rapper 347aidan and was produced by Great John.

Composition
The song samples vocals from 347aidan's song "Memories", while a guitar line over trap drums is played in the instrumental. Lyrically, Sleepy Hallow raps about not wanting to die young and his internal fears of it.

Music video
The music video, directed by Picture Perfect, executive produced by James "Aggie" Barrett, was released on May 25, 2022. It features animated visuals involving Sleepy Hallow and 347aidan, coupled with somber live action scenes.

Charts

Certifications

References

2022 singles
2022 songs
Sleepy Hallow songs
RCA Records singles
Songs about death
Trap music songs